The Hans Christian Andersen Museum or H.C. Andersens Odense, is a set of museums/buildings dedicated to the famous author Hans Christian Andersen in Odense, Denmark, some of which, at various times in history, have functioned as the main Odense-based museum on the author.  

They variously comprise: the H.C. Andersen Museum (existing museum), the H.C. Andersen Birthplace (original museum), the H.C. Andersen Childhood Home and even Møntergården (city museum). A new installation called House of Fairytales (called New H.C. Andersen Museum) is planned to open in late 2020.

They are administered and managed by Odense City Museums, a department of the Odense Municipality.

H.C. Andersen's Birthplace
The birthplace is located in the building which is thought his birthplace (not conclusively confirmed), a small yellow house on the corner of 45 Hans Jensens Stræde and Bangs Boder street in the old town. In 1908, the house was reopened as the H.C. Andersen Museum. It documents his life from his childhood years as the son of a shoemaker to his schooling, career as an author, and later life, with artifacts providing an insight into his acquaintances and adventures.  The birthplace is also known as H.C. Andersen's House, after the plaque at the front door .

H.C. Andersen's Childhood Home
Andersen's childhood home is at 3-5 Munkemøllestræde, not far from the cathedral. He lived in the little half-timbered house from the age of two until he was 14. Opened as a museum in 1930, the house contains an exhibition of the cobbling tools used by his father and other items based on Andersen's own descriptions.

H.C. Andersen Museum
The museum is located at 11 Claus Bergs Gade, and comprises exhibits and collections from Andersen's works and life.

Planned House of Fairytales

In 2016, it was announced that Japanese architect, Kengo Kuma, and museum design consultancy, Event Communications, had won an international competition to design a new House of Fairytales concept for the Hans Christian Andersen Museum (also called the New Hans Christian Andersen Museum).  Kuma's designs revolve around "a series of cylindrical volumes with glass and latticed timber facades, and scooped green roofs".  Event Communications said that the museum would follow an "immersive theatre" that "taps into a fundamental aspect of fairytales – they are journeys where the line between the everyday and the transformative is blurred".  The project is being managed by Odense City Museums and plans are for it to open in late 2020.

Gallery

References

External links
 Odense City Museums
Interview with Kengo Kuma: The New Hans Christian Andersen Museum, House of Fairytales, Odense City Museums, Denmark

Museums in Odense
Hans Christian Andersen
Museums established in 1908
1908 establishments in Denmark
Andersen, Hans Christian